WNPN (89.3 FM) is a radio station broadcasting an NPR news/talk format. It is the flagship broadcast outlet for The Public's Radio (formerly known as Rhode Island Public Radio). Its official community of license is Newport, Rhode Island, but from a tall tower in Tiverton the signal covers most of Rhode Island and the South Coast of Massachusetts. It also has repeater stations WNPE (102.7 FM) in Narragansett Pier and WPVD (1290 AM and 102.9 FM) in Providence. The network provides the sole local public radio outlet for Rhode Island.

Technical information
WNPN transmits using a Nautel GV15 transmitter with 10,187 watts transmitter power output to make 7,000 watts effective radiated power. A Shively Labs 6016 four-panel antenna array is used. An Omnia 9 FM/HD processor from The Telos Alliance is used to keep audio levels consistent.  A 67 kHz subcarrier is transmitted for the Massachusetts Radio Reading Service Audible Local Ledger.

The station broadcasts in digital HD Radio, with the HD2 channel devoted to a 24/7 feed of the BBC World Service.

History
The station signed on June 10, 2006, as WUMD, owned by the University of Massachusetts Dartmouth. WUMD served as a replacement for WSMU-FM, which began with 10 watts of power on 91.1 MHz as WUSM in September 1973. Its first studio was in the cafeteria basement. In the fall of 1974, WUSM moved its studio to the campus center and increased power. It remained a student-programmed station throughout the next three decades. The call letters changed to WSMU-FM in 1989. In June 2006, UMass Dartmouth sold the 91.1 frequency to the Educational Media Foundation, which relaunched it as WTKL; the programming that had been on WSMU-FM then moved to the new WUMD on 89.3.

Sale to Rhode Island Public Radio/The Public's Radio
On January 4, 2017, it was announced that UMass Dartmouth was selling WUMD to Rhode Island Public Radio for $1.5 million and $617,100 worth of underwriting for 10 years. RIPR intended to move WUMD to Tiverton, Rhode Island, to simulcast its programming. The FCC approved the transfer of the station license on May 1, 2017.
WUMD signed off for the final time at noon on June 26, 2017, following the consummation of the purchase. Rhode Island Public Radio began broadcasting its NPR news/talk format on July 12, 2017, and the callsign changed to WXNI. An FCC construction permit was sought and obtained to move 89.3 to the former tower of local ABC affiliate WLNE-TV in Tiverton, greatly increasing the area covered by the signal. The designated community of license was also to change from North Dartmouth, Massachusetts, to Newport, Rhode Island. On July 29, 2018, in preparation for the final move to Tiverton, the callsign was changed to WNPN. The FCC approval of the move to Newport was granted effective August 13, 2018.

On paper, WNPN, like its predecessors, operated at relatively modest power for a full NPR member on the FM band. However, it now broadcast from the tallest active FM tower in Rhode Island, at 833 feet (only WLVO's auxiliary site in Johnston is taller). This added over 700,000 people in Rhode Island and the South Coast to its coverage area. As a result, it now provided at least secondary coverage to almost all of Rhode Island, and also brought a city-grade NPR signal to New Bedford and most of the South Coast for the first time ever. Reflecting this increased coverage, two months after signing on WNPN from its new site, Rhode Island Public Radio rebranded itself as "The Public's Radio."

References

External links

Dartmouth, Massachusetts
Mass media in Bristol County, Massachusetts
Radio stations established in 2006
2006 establishments in Massachusetts
NPN
News and talk radio stations in the United States
Newport, Rhode Island